James Donaldson Brown (March 31, 1897 – October 22, 1944) was a professional baseball player. He played parts of two seasons in Major League Baseball, 1915 for the St. Louis Cardinals and 1916 for the Philadelphia Athletics, primarily as an outfielder.

According to the May/June 2010 Report of the Biographical Research Committee for the Society for American Baseball Research, after his baseball career, Brown was listed in the Los Angeles city directories at various times as a ballplayer, actor, and studio worker. He died October 22, 1944 in Bradwood, Oregon. The death certificate said that he was a resident of Hollywood, worked as a carpenter for a movie firm, and that he had been in Oregon for two months. He was buried in Oregon.

External links

Jim Brown at Sports Illustrated

Major League Baseball outfielders
St. Louis Cardinals players
Philadelphia Athletics players
Shreveport Gassers players
Galveston Sand Crabs players
Baseball players from Maryland
People from Laurel, Maryland
1897 births
1944 deaths
Jackson Convicts players
Jackson Chiefs players